The Sleepwalker is a Canadian animated short film, directed by Theodore Ushev and released in 2015. Inspired by Federico García Lorca's poem "Romance Sonámbulo", the film depicts the dreams of a woman through the interplay of abstract shapes and patterns.

The film received a Canadian Screen Award nomination for Best Animated Short Film at the 4th Canadian Screen Awards, and a Quebec Cinema Award nomination for Best Animated Short Film at the 18th Quebec Cinema Awards.

References

External links

2015 films
Canadian animated short films
Films directed by Theodore Ushev
2010s Canadian films